The Keeper is a 1976 Canadian comedy-thriller film written and directed by T.Y. Drake and starring Christopher Lee in the title role. The film was never released theatrically and went straight to television.

Synopsis
Christopher Lee is The Keeper, the sinister and crippled administrator of the secluded and exclusive Underwood Asylum in 1947 British Columbia where the community's wealthiest families have entrusted their mentally-disturbed relatives to his unique care. However, these families soon begin to die under grisly and unusual circumstances, leaving large inheritances to The Keeper's deranged patients.

Dick Driver (Tell Schreiber) is a private investigator hired by a mysterious client to investigate Underwood Asylum and he soon discovers the connection between The Keeper's therapy and the millionaires' deaths.

Cast
Christopher Lee as The Keeper
Tell Schreiber as Dick Driver
Sally Gray as Mae B. Jones
Ross Vezarian as Inspector Clarke
Ian Tracey as The Kid
Bing Jensen as Danny
Jack and Leo Leavy as The Biggs Twins

Production and release
The Keeper was filmed on a budget of $135,000 in Vancouver, British Columbia from October 1 to 24, 1975.

T.Y. Drake first became involved in the production as a writer, called in for a rewrite after the original proposal had been made to the Canadian Film Development Corporation (CFDC) by producer Donald Wilson. When the original director left the production, the project was later resubmitted with Drake as director, and accepted.

Although never released theatrically and shelved for nearly a decade, The Keeper went straight to television and finally premiered on December 19, 1985 as part of The CBS Late Movie. In 1987, the film was released on VHS by InterGlobal Home Video (Canada) and has long been out of print.

References

External links

1976 films
1970s comedy thriller films
Canadian comedy thriller films
Canadian independent films
CBS network films
CBS late-night programming
English-language Canadian films
Films about hypnosis
Films set in psychiatric hospitals
Films set in the 1940s
Films set in 1947
Films set in Vancouver
Films shot in Vancouver
1976 comedy films
Films with screenplays by Donald Wilson (writer and producer)
Films produced by Donald Wilson (writer and producer)
1970s English-language films
1970s Canadian films